Drink-Drank-Drunk is a 2005 Hong Kong film directed by Derek Yee.

Plot
A romantic comedy, the film is about Siu Min, a Budweiser girl who takes pity on Michael, an ethnic Chinese restaurateur from France drinking away his misfortune because his food is too sophisticated for (and thus unpopular with) the working-class neighborhood in which both work. Unsatisfied with spending her days as a beer girl, the ambitious Siu Min becomes Michael's partner in the restaurant business, and eventually falls in love with him. Michael, however, must reconcile his dream of traveling the world with his other dream of running a successful restaurant.

Cast
 Miriam Yeung - Siu Min
 Daniel Wu - Michael
 Alex Fong Chung-Sun - Brother Nine
 Henry Fong		
 Paul Fonoroff		
 Hayama Go		
 Asuka Higuchi		
 Tony Ho		
 Hu Jing - Kit
 Vincent Kok - Bo Bo (gay hot pot boss)
 Ella Koon - Yan Loh
 Toby Leung
 Chin Kar-lok - Big Bear
 Terence Yin - Wanderer (Michael's friend)

External links
 
 HK cinemagic entry

2005 films
Hong Kong romantic comedy films
Films directed by Derek Yee
2000s Hong Kong films